The 1966 Australia Cup was the fifth season of the Australia Cup, which was the main national association football knockout cup competition in Australia. Sixteen clubs from around Australia qualified to enter the competition.

Teams

Round 1

Quarter-finals

Semi-finals

	
The game was abandoned after 71 minutes due to a pitch invasion, and subsequently awarded to Sydney Hakoah.

Final

References

Aust
Australia Cup (1962–1968) seasons